19 Mayıs Tunnel, is a highway tunnel constructed on the Samsun-Çorum highway   in Samsun Province, northern Turkey.

It is situated near Paşapınarı village of Havza, Samsun. The -long twin-tube tunnel carrying two lanes of traffic in each direction is flanked by -long Havza Tunnel in the north and -long Şehzadeler Tunnel in the south on the same highway.

The tunnel was opened to traffic on February 15, 2009 by Turkish Prime Minister Recep Tayyip Erdoğan.

References

External links
 Map of road tunnels in Turkey at General Directorate of Highways (Turkey) (KGM)

Road tunnels in Turkey
Transport in Samsun Province
Tunnels completed in 2009